(née Abe, born 1980) is a professional backgammon player from Tokyo, Japan.  She became World Backgammon champion in 2014 and 2018.  Akiko is ranked 3rd on Giants of Backgammon in 2015, becoming the first female Backgammon Giant.

References 

1980 births
Living people
Backgammon players
Date of birth missing (living people)